"There Are Listed Buildings" is a song by Los Campesinos! and the first official single from their 2010 album Romance is Boring, released 2 November 2009. It was announced through the band's blog and was originally distributed on heavy-weight 7" by the band themselves on their 2009 October U.K. tour before being sold in a select number of independent record stores. The artwork was designed by photographer Cari Ann Wayman and featured no b-side unlike all other previous singles by the band.

The song was voted number one by listeners of Dandelion Radio in the 2009 Festive Fifty.

Track listing

Personnel
 Aleksandra – vocals, keyboard
 Ellen – bass guitar
 Gareth – vocals, glockenspiel
 Harriet – violin, keyboard
 Neil – guitar
 Ollie – drums
 Tom – lead guitar
 Jherek Bischoff - Brass
 John Goodmanson - producer

References

2009 singles
Los Campesinos! songs
2009 songs
Wichita Recordings singles